Jodi Long is an American actress. She is best known for her role as Madama on Cafe Americain (1993–1994), and Ok Cha on Sullivan and Son (2012–2014), and her role in Patty Hearst (1988). She won Best Supporting Actress at the Daytime Emmy Awards for her role in the Netflix series Dash & Lily (2020).

Early life and education 
Long was born as Jodi Leung in Manhattan and raised in Queens, New York. Long's mother is Kimiye "Trudy" Long (née Tsunemitsu), a Japanese-American clerk at the American Bible Society and a dancer at The China Doll night club. Long's father is Lawrence K. Long (stage name Larry Leung), of Cantonese-Scottish background who immigrated to the United States from Australia and had a career as a tap-dancer vaudevillian and later as a PGA golf professional.

Long graduated from New York's High School of Performing Arts and earned a BFA from the State University of New York at Purchase.

Career 
Long had roles in many feature films including Patty Hearst, RoboCop 3, Striking Distance, The Hot Chick, and Shang-Chi and the Legend of the Ten Rings. On television she appeared as a regular on such series as Cafe Americain, All-American Girl and Miss Match, all of which were short-lived. She played a therapist in Desperate Housewives, a "power lesbian" Patty in Sex and the City and a bar owner in Sullivan and Son.

Partway through the color music video clip of the 1986 song "Bizarre Love Triangle" by the English rock band New Order, Long makes a cameo appearance arguing with E. Max Frye about reincarnation.

On stage, she appeared in the 2002 Broadway revival of Flower Drum Song, winning an Ovation Award for her performance during the Los Angeles tryout. Her parents, both of whom were vaudeville-style performers, appeared on The Ed Sullivan Show on May 7, 1950 as the singing, dancing, comedy act, Larry and Trudie Leung. They were the subjects of a documentary film, Long Story Short, which was directed by Christine Choy, an Academy Award-nominated director and written by Long. The documentary won the 2008 Los Angeles Asian Pacific Film Festival's Grand Jury's Honorable Mention for a Documentary Award as well as the Audience Award. She was recently starring as Korean American mother Ok Cha in Sullivan & Son which was cancelled on November 20, 2014, by TBS.

Filmography

Film

Television

References

External links
Article on Jodi Long in the webzine ''Chop Block
Yahoo! Movies biography

American film actresses
American television actresses
Living people
State University of New York at Purchase alumni
Actresses from New York City
American actresses of Chinese descent
American people of Scottish descent
American actresses of Japanese descent
American film actors of Asian descent
People from Queens, New York
Fiorello H. LaGuardia High School alumni
20th-century American actresses
21st-century American actresses
Year of birth missing (living people)